The Muslim uprisings in Kars and Sharur–Nakhichevan were a series of insurgencies by local Muslims against the administration of the First Republic of Armenia, begininng on 1 July 1919 and ending 28 July 1920. The areas of uprising were persuaded into insurrection by the sedition of Turkish and Azerbaijani agents who were trying to destabilize Armenia in order to form a pan-Turkic corridor between their nations.

Following the withdrawal of the Ottoman army from the South Caucasus, local Muslims in the formerly occupied areas were armed and assisted in establishing political states with the aim of resisting reincorporation into Armenia. In the spring of 1919, the British command in the Caucasus assisted Armenia in defeating these statelets; however, some months later due to the efforts of Turkish and Azerbaijani emissaries, Armenian administration collapsed and the region fell under local control again until the Armenian counteroffensive in the summer of 1920. The Armenian campaign to reabsorb the Nakhichevan region was halted by the forces of Soviet Russia who had invaded Azerbaijan earlier in the year. The Kars region was briefly reincorporated into Armenian governance until it was conquered by Turkish forces by the end of the Turkish–Armenian war in December 1920.

Investigations conducted by American relief workers confirmed the reports of large-scale massacres of the local Armenians in the Sharur–Nakhichevan region. Armenia was assisted only by the forces of Anton Denikin who dispatched ammunition to replenish the enervated Armenian army.

Background 

On 4 June 1918, in the aftermath of the October Revolution and the collapse of Russian authority in the South Caucasus, the newly independent First Republic of Armenia was forced to relinquish extensive territories to the Ottoman Empire through the Treaty of Batum. The districts surrendered consisted of Kars and western parts of the Erivan Governorate including most of the counties of Surmalu and Nakhichevan (present-day Iğdır Province and Nakhchivan, respectively).

Following the Armistice of Mudros, the Ottoman army was forced to withdraw from the formerly-Russian territories it had seized. The withdrawal which occurred throughout 1918–1919 left Muslim puppet states in the wake of the retreat to hinder the westward expansion of the fledgling Armenian and Georgian republics.

The Provisional National Government of the Southwestern Caucasus and the Republic of Aras existed for some months until their capitulation by Armenian and British forces in April 1919. Despite the apparent defeat of the Ottoman Empire, Turkish agitators, invigorated by the British withdrawal from the South Caucasus, were reportedly encouraging sedition amongst Muslim villagers in Armenia—the subversive activities culminating in a series of anti-Armenian uprisings in the summer of 1919.

A contemporary source writes: "By the summer of 1919, the question of repatriation was completely overshadowed by widespread Muslim uprisings. The issues at stake had transformed the repatriation question into a matter of Armenian survival." In 1921, C. E. Bechhofer Roberts wrote: "[On] the Igdir front … General Sebo was holding the Kurds at bay … [T]owards Ararat … was the Kamarloo front. There the enemy was the Tartar, supported, of course, by Turkish auxiliaries and excited by their agents. Far away in the East is the way to Nahichevan, which was in the possession of the enemy."

Azerbaijani uprisings

Zangibasar 
Despite Armenia appointing a local Azerbaijani official in the region, the latter's authority did not effectively extend from their post in Ulukhanlu (now also part of Masis) as it was undermined by the presence of Turkish and Azerbaijani envoys who were encouraging locals to sabotage infrastructure and to raid nearby Armenian villages—which many did with the help of Turkish soldiery.

Vedibasar 
The district of Vedibasar constituted the south of the Ararat Province and was predominantly Azerbaijani-populated, with its key town in Boyuk Vedi (present-day Vedi). On 1 July 1919, raiders from Boyuk Vedi attacked the railway town of Davalu (present-day Ararat), killing several Armenian soldiers and civilians. 3 days later, a detachment of 400 soldiers of the Armenian army issued an ultimatum to Boyuk Vedi to surrender the raiders and the stolen belongings of the murdered, however, the rebels answered with machine-gun fire which scattered the detachment and caused a least 160 casualties. In the following 10 days, the Armenian army attempted to storm the village, though were unsuccessful due to the defenders being bolstered by Turkish officers. On 10 August 1919, General Drastamat Kanayan launched a counteroffensive which recaptured 5 rebelling villages and reached the heights of Boyuk Vedi, however, the town would not be retaken until the following year.

On 14 July 1919, the Azerbaijani envoy to Armenia  who played a "great role in the successful resistance of Muslims" dispatched the following note to the foreign minister of Azerbaijan:

Three days earlier, Takinski had apprised the Azerbaijani government of the unsuccessful Armenian counterattack at Boyuk Vedi which resulted in 200 casualties and led to the locals seizing "two artillery pieces and eight machine guns". Though the Armenians attributed their failure to the presence of Turkish soldiery, historian Jamil Hasanli writes that it was determined that there was "not a single Turkish soldier in these villages".

Sharur–Nakhichevan 

Encouraged by the uprisings near Yerevan, on 18 July 1919, Halil Sami Bey crossed the border from Doğubayazıt into Sharur to lead a local cavalry unit. The British command later received word that the Armenian authorities in Nakhichevan had become "powerless", as indicated by the inter-ethnic clashes that erupted over the following days. The city of Nakhchivan shortly thereafter became the center of an Armenian pogrom, thus the republic's administration over the region was shattered. On 21 July, Takinski reported to his government that Armenian governance had been ousted from Sharur. As the uprising spread throughout the Nakhichevan uezd, Armenians in Jugha (present-day Gülüstan) were forced to escape across the Aras river into Iran. Some 6,000 Armenians from Nakhichevan living in the Ararat Valley managed to escape to Daralayaz, the Nor Bayazet uezd, and the Zangezur uezd (present-day Vayots Dzor, Gegharkunik, and Syunik provinces, respectively). As a result of the uprising, Halil Sami Bey was responsible for the destruction of 45 Armenian villages and the massacre of 10,000 of their inhabitants in Sharur–Nakhichevan, including the destruction of the large Armenian-populated town of Verin Agulis (present-day Yuxarı Əylis) and its 1,400 inhabitants. Later in the year, Azerbaijani general Samed bey Mehmandarov complained to his government about the presence of Iranian agents trying to entice Muslim refugees in Sharur–Nakhichevan to seek refuge in Iran.

Suppression 
Having no expectation that the ultimatum would be answered, the Armenian army launched an offensive to recapture the rebelling villages on the following day. In the fight for Zangibasar, Lieutenant Aram Kajaznuni, the son of the first prime minister of Armenia was killed, however, the Armenians were victorious on 21 June and had secured the peripheries of Yerevan, however, the locals (mainly Tatars, later known as Azerbaijanis) fled into the neighboring Surmalu uezd to Aralık to avoid retribution. After the battle, volunteer detachments consisting of Armenian refugees from the Aresh and Nukha uezds of Azerbaijan looted the abandoned homes.

The voices of the militaristic factions in the Armenian government were strengthened by the successes in Zangibasar and Olty, therefore, the army prepared to retake the districts of Vedibasar and Sharur–Nakhichevan; the advance into the former began on 11 July and by the next day, Armenian forces had recaptured the district and Boyuk Vedi, reaching the boundary of the Erivan and Sharur-Daralayaz uezds at the mountain pass known as the Volchi vorota—this again caused the local Muslims to flee, now southward to Sharur.

On 14 July, the Armenian advance continued through the Volchi vorota into the Sharur district, capturing it 2 days later whilst the locals fled across the Aras river into Iran. By this time, the 11th Army of Soviet Russia which had previously invaded Azerbaijan reached southern Nakhichevan to form a link with Nationalist Turkey. Colonel Tarkhov, the commander of the "united troops of the Soviet Russia and Red Turkey in Nakhichevan" in addressing the Armenians in Şahtaxtı proclaimed Soviet rule over the rest of Nakhichevan, thereby ending the Armenian campaign.

During the campaign, the Persian ministry of foreign affairs tried to delay the Armenian advance for a few days, stating that "the inhabitants of Nakhichevan were petitioning for protection through the sardar of Maku and the authorities at Tabriz" and that as the rebels were "former Persian subjects and overwhelmingly Shia", the government "could not remain indifferent to their appeal."

Turko-Kurdish uprisings

Surmalu 
The Surmalu uezd was the site of large-scale inter-ethnic clashes between Armenians and Muslims in early 1918, during the Ottoman advance—following the latter's withdrawal from the county, Armenians from Van and Sasun provided for the repatriation of Armenians in Surmalu. The following year, whilst the uprisings in the Erivan uezd raged, partisans in Aralikh led by a Turkish officer from Erzurum attacked the Armenian army to relieve pressure on rebelling Boyuk Vedi. In early August, Kurdish tribesmen led by Shamil bey Airumlinsky ousted the thinly stretched Armenian garrison from the peripheries of Surmalu, forcing hundreds of Armenian and Yazidi civilians to flee to Iğdır, later causing many to flee across the Aras river into the neighboring Etchmiadzin uezd (present-day Armavir and Aragatsotn provinces) to escape the raids. Thereafter, Armenian rule was limited to the plains of the Surmalu uezd around the administrative center Iğdır. The Kurdish raids continuing into September were answered by Turkish-Armenian detachments, during which rebelling Kurdish villages were burned.

Kağızman 
On 17 August 1919, more than a thousand Kurdish tribesmen led by Omar Agha and Hasan Bey fought the Armenian garrison commanded by Colonel Shaghrutyan near Kağızman in the Kagizman Okrug, demanding that the Armenians withdraw from the region. The following day, the Armenians successfully pushed the Kurds away from the town, two days later pushing the Kurds to the hills. Two days later, the Armenians captured the peak Gümrüdağı, forcing the tribesmen to retreat to Barduz (present-day Gaziler). As a result of roads and railway being severed by Kurdish and Turkish partisans, 6,000 Armenian and Greek peasants fled from Sarıkamış. In early September the Armenian army regained control over the republic's former borders in Kars and repatriated the Armenian, Greek, and Russian peasants who had fled the insurgents. The raiders in their retreat were accompanied by Turkish and Kurdish refugees and civilians fleeing from the areas recaptured by Armenia.

Ardahan–Kars 
Since its annexation of the Kars Oblast, the Armenian administration had delegated authority to local Muslim officials in the subdistricts Çıldır (consisting of 40 Muslim villages), Aghbaba (present-day Amasia, consisting of 42 Muslim villages), and Zarushad (present-day Arpaçay, consisting of 45 Muslim and 20 Russian sectarian villages) to ensure their loyalty—these subdistricts laid within the districts of Ardahan and Kars. Despite the presence of Turkish and Azerbaijani provocateurs carrying large sums of money in the region, Armenia did not attempt to disarm the local population. The provocateurs on 12 January 1920 intended to train a local militia from the population of the villages to occupy the railway passing the Armenian-populated town of Kizil-Chakhchakh (present-day Akyaka). On 24 January, the Armenian administration was completely ousted from Chaldyr, Aghbaba, and Zarushad—the following day, martial law was declared in the district. The Armenian army led by Colonel  on 28 January unsuccessfully utilised the local "coldly neutral" Russian Molokans of Zarushad as representatives to demand that the rebelling Muslims submit to Armenia. Shortly thereafter, on 1 February, the Armenian army shelled, set fire to, and occupied a number of rebelling villages, effectively routing the rebels of Zarushad. Nine days later, Zarushad's leaders officially accepted Armenian authority, and later confirmed it in-person to the provincial administration in Kars. Chaldyr later submitted on 14 March, however, the Armenian army continued to shell their settlements. The uprising and subsequent countermeasures had resulted in the displacement of up to 10,000 inhabitants of 20 villages, many of whom sought refuge in Azerbaijan.

Penek 
Occurring simultaneously with the Armenian counteroffensive against the rebels of Zangibasar, an attempt was made to seize the coal reserves in Penek in the Kurdish-controlled Olti Okrug (present-day eastern Erzurum Province). Armenian policy towards integration of Muslim areas was divided between peaceful civilian incorporation with local autonomy, and military invasion and threats, ultimately, the latter policy prevailed in the case of Olty, to the chagrin of the governor-general of Kars. Armenian and Turkish reports confirmed the presence of Turkish soldiers operating in the district; despite this, the Armenian offensive to capture the western half of the okrug began on 19 June 1920. By 22 June, the Armenian army had converged on Penek and ousted its Turko-Kurdish defenders, setting the new Armenian–Turkish frontier at the Oltu river

Allied reaction

Proposed neutral zone 
William N. Haskell, the Allied High Commissioner for Armenia, only a week after the subjugation of the Karabakh Council to Azerbaijan suggested the creation of a neutral zone in the south of Erivan Governorate including the rebelling districts of Sharur–Nakhichevan. On 29 August 1919, Fatali Khan Khoyski, the Prime Minister of Azerbaijan, agreed to the arrangement with modifications, such as the inclusion of the Armenian-controlled Daralayaz region in the neutral zone, also providing that Azerbaijan would bear the operational expenses of such an entity and provide for the construction of a railway between Julfa and Baku. When Haskell brought this agreement before Armenian officials, already signed by the Khoyski, it was rejected due to the implication it would create of the region becoming a technical part of Azerbaijan, and that it would include the Daralayaz sub-district of the Sharur-Daralayaz uezd, which was under stable Armenian control and served as a vital connection between Yerevan and Armenian-controlled Zangezur. Armenian officials insisted on an American governorship to be created, limited in size to the areas under control of insurgents, however, this was rejected by the Azerbaijani government as it would not achieve its aim of severing Zangezur from Armenia.

American investigation 
In the investigation by American relief workers, it was discovered that there were 7,000 Armenian refugees from Sharur in addition to 2,400 who had remained in one of the eight villages unable to return to their homes. Halil Sami Bey, in representing the rebel authorities of Nakhichevan, declared in a meeting with American officials that they would never allow the region to be ruled by Armenia again. One of the American relief officials involved in the investigation, Clarence Ussher, reported that practically all the Armenian villages in Nakhichevan–Sharur had been abandoned or repossessed by the local Muslims.

Russian arms 
Armenian-American historian Richard G. Hovannisian argues that it was in the interest of Anton Denikin, the leader of the Volunteer Army, to protect Armenia because their existence prevented "Turkish intrusion into the Caucasus" which could jeopardise Russian military operations in the North Caucasus. Additionally, so long as Azerbaijan and Georgia suspected a secret military alliance between Armenia and South Russia, they couldn't focus all of their military forces against Denikin. In early September, 3 million rounds of ammunition were sent from the Armed Forces of South Russia to Armenia.

Aftermath 

Some 5 months after the last uprising was suppressed, in December 1920 the Armenian republic was partitioned between Soviet Russia and Kemalist Turkey, ending its two and a half years of existence. The entirety of the Surmalu and Kars regions, with the exception of the Aghbaba subcounty, were ceded to the Government of the Grand National Assembly and emptied of its Armenian population—this was confirmed by the 1921 treaties of Kars and Moscow. Conversely, most of the Erivan uezd was retained by Soviet Armenia, with the southernmost section forming the Nakhichevan ASSR of Soviet Azerbaijan along with the Sharur subcounty of Sharur-Daralayaz uezd, and most of the Nakhichevan uezd.

Notes

References

Bibliography 

 
 
 
 
 
 
 
 
 
 
 
 
 
 
 
 
 
 
 
 
 
 
 
 
 
 
 

Conflicts in 1919
Conflicts in 1920
20th-century rebellions
First Republic of Armenia
Modern history of Armenia
1919 in Armenia
Massacres in 1919
July 1919 events
Anti-Armenianism in Azerbaijan
Massacres of Armenians
Massacres in Azerbaijan